Goeppertia warscewiczii (previously Calathea warszewiczii) is a species of perennial, herbaceous plant in the Marantaceae family, endemic to Costa Rica and Nicaragua. It grows up to 0.5 to 1 meters (20-40 inches) high, by 0.5 to 1 meters (20-40 inches) wide, with patterned lanceolate leaves, and white cone-like inflorescences that fade to yellow or pink.

Synonyms
 Calathea warszewiczii (L. Mathieu ex Planch.) Planch. & Linden
 Maranta warscewiczii L. Mathieu ex Planch.
 Maranta warscewiczii L. Mathieu
 Phyllodes warscewiczii (L. Mathieu) Kuntze

References

 Cat. Pl. Exot. 10: 3 1855.

warscewiczii